Sylver are a Belgian Eurodance and pop group, which originally consists of lead vocalist Silvy De Bie (born 4 January 1981) and keyboardist/songwriter Wout Van Dessel (born 19 October 1974). They were active between 2000 until 2014, when De Bie decided to focus on her solo career, but returned in 2016.

History

2000-02: Career beginnings and "Chances"

The band was formed in the year 2000 as "Liquid feat. Silvy" and released in France and Belgium the single "Turn the Tide" and in the rest of Europe it was released in 2001 under the "Sylver" band name. In Germany, the single immediately moved to number 8 in the charts, and within 8 weeks was number 2 (under Atomic Kitten's "Whole Again"), staying in the top 10 for 12 weeks. The debut album "Chances" debuted a month later at 16 and spent 49 weeks in the top 100, which is Sylver's most successful studio album to date. Follow up singles "Forever In Love", "In Your Eyes" and "Forgiven" also made the charts. In 2001 "Skin" was only released in Belgium, while in 2002 "The Smile Has Left Your Eyes" has been released as the sixth and final single only in Spain, where it peaked at number 5.

2003-05: "Little Things" and "Nighttime Calls"
In 2003, the second album Little Things was released with a similar success peaking at number 7 in the Belgian album charts, with the hit singles "Livin' My Life" and "Why Worry". More singles out of the album have been the double A-Side "Shallow Water"/"Confused" and the fourth and final single "Wild Horses" released in Belgium and Germany in 2003 with limited success. On 2 November 2004 the third studio album Nighttime Calls was released; it became Sylver's least successful studio album to date peaking only at number 23 in the Belgian album charts. The first single "Love is an Angel" of the album hit the Belgian top 10 immediately upon its release on 20 September. In 2005, the follow up singles "Make It" and "Take Me Back" were released, being moderate hits in Belgium and Germany respectively.

2006-07: "Crossroads" and "The Hit Collection"
The fourth studio album Crossroads was released in May 2006. The major hit is Lay All Your Love On Me, a cover version from ABBA, which also marks Sylver's first cover version single release ever, peaking at number 5 in the Belgian single charts. From now on in addition to synthesizer and drum machine, Sylver uses guitar, piano, and percussion instruments for a more mature pop sound. Follow up singles "One Night Stand" and "Why" have been released as second and third releases respectively. In 2007, the first compilation album "Best Of - The Hit Collection 2001-2007" has been released with "The One" being the first and only single release out of it, which peaked at number 4 in the Belgian single charts.

2008-09: "Sacrifice" and Addition of John Miles Jr.
In 2008, the singles "One World, One Dream" and "Rise Again" have been released. In 2009, Sylver included as their third band member the English guitarist John Miles Jr.,  who had earlier been a member of another popular Belgian group, Milk Inc. Three more songs, called "I Hate You Now", the Mike Oldfield cover of "Foreign Affair" and "Music" have been released as a trio, of which the latter was a cover of bandmember John Miles Jr.'s father John Miles, but also features John Miles as an artist. Sylver's fifth studio album Sacrifice was released on 8 May 2009 only in Belgium, where it peaked at number 3 in the album charts.  The album earned the band the TMF award for "Best Domestic Album" in 2009.

2010-12: "Decade" and single releases
In 2010, the second compilation album "Decade - The Very Best Of Sylver" has been released to the band's 10th anniversary with "It's My Life" being the first and only single release out of it. The album peaked at number 1 at the Belgian album charts, being Sylvers most successful album there, while the single still managed to be a top 20 hit in the Belgian single charts. In addition to their 10th anniversary, Sylver released a new version of their very first single "Turn the Tide". In 2011 and in 2012, the singles "Stop Feeling Sorry" and "City Of Angels" have been released as singles only. These two singles mark the final singles to feature original lead vocalist Silvy De Bie (aka Seeley's Girl), who will leave the band after thirteen years in the following year.

2014: Departure of De Bie and hiatus
The group's original lead vocalist Silvy De Bie left the band in early 2014, leaving the band without a vocalist and an uncertain future, which forces the band on a temporary hiatus.

2016 Return
In the spring of 2016 the band officially announced their reunion, and has already started to write new material.

In 2017, they released their single "Turn Your Love Around".  In October 2019, Sylver released their single "I Won't Wait".

In October 2019, Sylver announced their "Sylver Lining Tour 2020" with full live-band to celebrate their 20-year anniversary, which will kick-off in Concertzaal Casino in Sint-Niklaas, Belgium on 20 March 2020 .

Discography

Studio albums

Compilation albums

Singles

References

External links

 Official website

Belgian trance music groups
Belgian Eurodance groups
Belgian house music groups